A man-eater is an animal that preys on humans as a pattern of hunting behavior. This does not include the scavenging of corpses, a single attack born of opportunity or desperate hunger, or the incidental eating of a human that the animal has killed in self-defense. However, all three cases (especially the last two) may habituate an animal to eating human flesh or to attacking humans, and may foster the development of man-eating behavior.

Although humans can be attacked by many kinds of non-human animals, man-eaters are those that have incorporated human flesh into their usual diet and actively hunt and kill humans. Most reported cases of man-eaters have involved lions, tigers, leopards, polar bears, and large crocodilians. However, they are not the only predators that will attack humans if given the chance; a wide variety of species have also been known to adopt humans as usual prey, including various bears, Komodo dragons, spotted and striped hyenas.

Felines

Tigers

Tigers are recorded to have killed more people than any other big cat, and have been responsible for more human deaths through direct attack than any other wild mammal. About 1,000 people were reportedly killed each year in India during the early 1900s, with one individual Bengal tigress killing 436 people in India. Tigers killed 129 people in the Sundarbans mangrove forest from 1969 to 1971. Unlike leopards and lions, man-eating tigers rarely enter human habitations in order to acquire prey. The majority of victims were reportedly in the tiger's territory when the attack took place. Additionally, tiger attacks mostly occur during daylight hours, unlike those involving leopards and lions.
The Sundarbans is home to approximately 600 royal Bengal tigers who before modern times used to "regularly kill fifty or sixty people a year". In 2008, a loss of habitat due to the Cyclone Sidr led to an increase in the number of attacks on humans in the Indian side of the Sundarbans, as tigers were crossing over to the Indian side from Bangladesh.

A theory promoted to explain this suggests that since tigers drink fresh water, the salinity of the area waters serve as a destabilizing factor in the diet and life of tigers of Sundarbans, keeping them in constant discomfort and making them extremely aggressive. Other theories include the sharing of their habitat with humans and the consumption of human corpses during floods.

Lions

Man-eating lions have been recorded to actively enter human villages at night as well as during the day to acquire prey. This greater assertiveness usually makes man-eating lions easier to dispatch than tigers. Lions typically become man-eaters for the same reasons as tigers: starvation, old age and illness, though as with tigers, some man-eaters were reportedly in perfect health.

The most notorious case of man-eating lions ever documented happened in 1898 in what was then known as British East Africa, now Kenya. During the construction of a rail bridge over the Tsavo river (part of the Uganda railway) in modern-day Tsavo national park, two enormous maneless male Tsavo lions terrorized the railway workers, most of them imported from India, and were believed to have killed or devoured over 130 men. The entire railway project had to be halted as the then British prime minister sounded the alarm. They were eventually tracked and killed by the project's chief engineer and required 8 men to carry each to camp.

Man-eating lions studies indicate that African lions eat humans as a supplement to other food, not as a last resort. In July 2018, a South African news website reported that three rhino poachers were mauled and eaten by lions at Sibuya Game Reserve in Eastern Cape province, South Africa.

Leopards

Man-eating leopards are a small percentage of all leopards, but have undeniably been a menace in some areas; one leopard in India killed over 200 people. Jim Corbett was noted to have stated that unlike tigers, which usually became man-eaters because of infirmity, leopards more commonly did so after scavenging on human corpses. In the area that Corbett knew well, dead people are usually cremated completely, but when there is a bad disease epidemic, the death rate outruns the supply of cremation pyre wood and people burn the body a little and throw it over the edge of the burning ghat. In Asia, man-eating leopards usually attack at night, and have been reported to break down doors and thatched roofs in order to reach human prey. Attacks in Africa are reported less often, though there have been occasions where attacks occurred in daylight. Both Corbett and Kenneth Anderson have written that hunting the man eating panther presented more challenges than any other animal. In 2019 in India, an infant was stolen and decapitated by a leopard.

Jaguars

Jaguar attacks on humans are rare nowadays. In the past, they were more frequent, at least after the arrival of Conquistadors in the Americas. The risk to humans would likely increase if the number of capybaras, the jaguar's primary prey, decreased.

Cougars

Due to the expanding human population, cougar ranges increasingly overlap with areas inhabited by humans. Attacks on humans are very rare, as cougar prey recognition is a learned behavior and they do not generally recognize humans as prey. Attacks on people, livestock, and pets may occur when a puma habituates to humans or is in a condition of severe starvation. Attacks are most frequent during late spring and summer, when juvenile cougars leave their mothers and search for new territory. Unlike other big cat man-eaters, cougars do not kill humans as a result of old age or food preference, but in defense of their territory. Such behavior has been documented in hunts by humans, where the cougar is flushed out by dogs which it either outruns or mauls some distance away. Then, the cougar circles around and mauls the hunter in ambush attack.

Primates

The only documented man-eaters among the great apes are humans themselves and chimpanzees. As humans encroach further on chimpanzee habitat, the occurrence of them killing human children has allegedly become more common.

Canids

Wolves

Contrasted to other carnivorous mammals known to attack humans for food, the frequency with which wolves have been recorded to kill people is rather low, indicating that, though potentially dangerous, wolves are among the least threatening for their size and predatory potential, except for the dog which poses lethal hazards for reasons other than predation. In the rare cases in which man-eating wolf attacks occur, the majority of victims are children. Habituation is a known factor contributing to some man-eating wolf attacks which results from living close to human habitations, causing wolves to lose their fear of humans and consequently approach too closely, much like urban coyotes. Habituation can also happen when people intentionally encourage wolves to approach them, usually by offering them food, or unintentionally, when people do not sufficiently intimidate them. This is corroborated by accounts demonstrating that wolves in protected areas are more likely to show boldness toward humans than ones in areas where they are actively hunted.

Dingoes

Attacks on humans by dingoes are rare, with only two recorded fatalities in Australia. Dingoes are normally shy of humans and avoid encounters with them. The most famous record of a dingo attack was the 1980 disappearance of nine-week-old Azaria Chamberlain. Her parents reported that they both saw a dingo taking Azaria out of their tent when she and her family were out on a camping trip to Ayers Rock. In 2019 in Australia, a father saved his 14-month-old child from a dingo which had dragged it away.

Domestic dogs

Although dogs have many of the characteristics of bears and big cats, they are unlikely to act as man-eaters themselves. More often humans can be bitten to death by packs of stray dogs, but not eaten. It often occurs in the countries of Eastern Europe, ex-USSR countries, and some South Asian countries like India. Predatory acts by dogs upon humans have occurred, however, and many such incidents were the result of human misconduct.

Coyotes
Almost all known predatory coyote attacks on humans have failed.  To date, other than the Kelly Keen coyote attack and the Taylor Mitchell coyote attack, all known victims have survived by fighting, fleeing, or being rescued, and only in the latter case was the victim partially eaten, although that case occurred in Nova Scotia where the local animals are eastern coyotes (coywolves).

Jackals
In June 2019, a nine-year-old boy was killed by jackals in Farakka, West Bengal, India. This was witnessed by a neighbor, who saw the child's half-eaten body being dragged by the pack of seven jackals.

Bears

Polar bears
Polar bears, particularly young and undernourished ones, will hunt people for food. Although bears rarely attack humans, bear attacks often cause devastating injuries due to the size and immense strength of the giant land and shoreline carnivores. As with dogs, predatory intent is not necessary; territorial disputes and protection of cubs can result in death by bear attack. Truly man-eating bear attacks are uncommon, but are known to occur when the animals are diseased or natural prey is scarce, often leading them to attack and eat anything they are able to kill.

Brown bears
Brown bears are known to sometimes hunt hikers and campers for food in North America. For example, Lance Crosby, 63, of Billings, Montana, was hiking alone and without bear spray in Yellowstone National Park in August 2015 when he was attacked by a  grizzly bear. The park rules say people should hike in groups and always carry bear spray – a form of pepper spray that is used to deter aggressive bears. His body was found in the Lake Village section of the park in northwest Wyoming. Timothy Treadwell and his girlfriend Amie Huguenard were killed and almost fully eaten by a 28-year-old brown bear on October 5, 2003. The bear's stomach was later found to contain human remains and clothing. In July 2008, dozens of starving brown bears killed two geologists working at a salmon hatchery in Kamchatka. After the partially eaten remains of the two workers were discovered, authorities responded by dispatching hunters to cull or disperse the bears.

American black bears
While American black bears rarely attack people, lone, predatory black bears are responsible for most fatal black bear attacks on humans in the United States and Canada, according to a study from 2011.  Unlike female bears, motivated to attack humans to protect cubs, male black bears actually prey on humans, viewing them as a potential food source.

Other bear species
Though usually shy and cautious animals, Asian black bears are more aggressive toward humans than the brown bears of Eurasia. In some areas of India and Burma, sloth bears are more feared than tigers, due to their unpredictable temperament.

Hyenas
Although hyenas readily feed upon human corpses, they are generally very wary of humans and less dangerous than the big cats whose territory overlaps with theirs. Nonetheless, both the spotted hyena and the smaller striped hyena are powerful predators quite capable of killing an adult human, and are known to attack people when food is scarce. Like most predators, hyena attacks tend to target women, children, and infirm men, though both species can and do attack healthy adult males on occasion. The spotted hyena is the more dangerous of the two species, being larger, more predatory, and more aggressive than the striped hyena. The brown hyena and aardwolf are not known to prey on humans.

Suidae

Pigs

Pigs are competent predators and can kill and eat helpless humans unable to escape them. Numerous animal trials in the Middle Ages involved pigs accused of eating children. In 2019, a woman was attacked and killed by a herd of feral hogs in rural Texas. She died due to exsanguination (i.e. bled to death) from bite wounds.

Rodents

Rats

Despite small individual size, rats in large numbers can kill helpless people by eating humans alive.

Rat torture has been documented by Amnesty International.
Large sized rats (some as big as a small cat) have been seen to feed upon human corpses in mortuaries in India.

Reptiles

Crocodiles

Crocodile attacks on people are common in places where crocodiles are native. The saltwater and Nile crocodiles are responsible for more attacks and more deaths than any other wild predator that attacks humans for food. Each year, hundreds of deadly attacks are attributed to the Nile crocodile within sub-Saharan Africa. Because many relatively healthy populations of Nile crocodiles occur in East Africa, their proximity to people living in poverty and/or without infrastructure has made it likely that the Nile crocodile is responsible for more attacks on humans than all other species combined. One notorious man-eating crocodilian was Gustave. In Australia, crocodiles have also been responsible for several deaths in the tropical north of the country. The mugger crocodile is another man-eater that kills many people in Asia each year, although not to the same level as the saltwater and Nile crocodiles. All crocodile species are also dangerous to humans, but most do not actively prey on them.

Alligators

Despite their manifest ability to kill prey similar to or larger than humans in size and their commonness in an area of dense human settlement (the southeastern United States, especially Florida), American alligators rarely prey upon humans.  Even so, there have been several notable instances of alligators opportunistically attacking humans, especially the careless, small children, and elderly. Unlike the far more dangerous saltwater and Nile crocodiles, the majority of alligators avoid contact with humans if possible, especially if they have been hunted. Incidents have happened, and they may not all have been predatory in nature.

Snakes
Only very few species of snakes are physically capable of swallowing an adult human. Although quite a few claims have been made about giant snakes swallowing adult humans, only a limited number have been confirmed. In 2017 in Indonesia, an adult was discovered inside of a  python, and on 14 June 2018 a 54-year-old woman named Wa Tiba was eaten by a reticulated python, which had slithered into her garden at her home. Large constricting snakes will sometimes constrict and kill prey that are too large to swallow. Also, multiple cases are documented of medium-sized ( to ) captive Burmese pythons constricting and killing humans, including several nonintoxicated, healthy adult men, one of whom was a "student" zookeeper. In the zookeeper case, the python was attempting to swallow the zookeeper's head when other keepers intervened. In addition, at least one Burmese python as small as  constricted and killed an intoxicated adult man.

A large constricting snake may constrict or swallow an infant or a small child, a threat that is legitimate and empirically proven. Cases of python attacks on children have been recorded for the green anaconda, the African rock python, and the Burmese python.

In the Philippines, more than a quarter of Aeta men (a modern forest-dwelling hunter-gatherer group) have reported surviving reticulated python predation attempts. Pythons are nonvenomous, ambush predators, and both the Aeta and pythons hunt deer, wild pigs, and monkeys, making them competitors and prey.

In South Africa in 2002, a 10-year-old boy was swallowed whole by a  African rock python, but cases like these are empirically observed and recorded but not entirely confirmed unlike the cases mentioned above.

In Australia there has been one recorded case of an amethystine python attempting to consume an adult human.

Lizards
Large Komodo dragons are the only known lizard species to occasionally attack and consume humans. Because they live on remote islands, attacks are infrequent and may go unreported. Despite their large size, attacks on people are often unsuccessful and the victims manage to escape with their lives, albeit severely wounded.

Birds
Some evidence supports the contention that the African crowned eagle occasionally views human children as prey, with a witness account of one attack (in which the victim, a seven-year-old boy, survived and the eagle was killed), and the discovery of part of a human child skull in a nest. This would make it the only living bird known to prey on humans, although other birds such as ostriches and cassowaries have killed humans in self-defense and a lammergeier might have killed Aeschylus by accident. Various large raptors like golden eagles are reported attacking humans, but its unclear if they intend to eat them or if they have ever been successful in killing one.

A series of incidents in which a martial eagle attacked and killed one human child as well as injuring two others was recorded in Ethiopia in 2019.

Some fossil evidence indicates large birds of prey occasionally preyed on prehistoric hominids. The Taung Child, an early human found in Africa, is believed to have been killed by an eagle-like bird similar to the crowned eagle. The extinct Haast's eagle may have preyed on humans in New Zealand, and this conclusion would be consistent with Maori folklore. Leptoptilos robustus might have preyed on both Homo floresiensis and anatomically modern humans, and the Malagasy crowned eagle, teratorns, Woodward's eagle and Caracara major are similar in size to the Haast's eagle, implying that they similarly could pose a threat to a human being.

Fish

Sharks

Contrary to popular belief, only a limited number of shark species are known to pose a serious threat to humans. The species that are most dangerous can be indiscriminate and will take any potential meal they happen to come across (as an oceanic whitetip might eat a person floating in the water after a shipwreck), or may bite out of curiosity or mistaken identity (as with a great white shark attacking a human on a surfboard possibly because it resembles its favoured prey, a seal).

Of more than 568 shark species, only four have been involved in a significant number of fatal unprovoked attacks on humans: the great white shark, tiger shark, bull shark, and the oceanic whitetip shark. These sharks, being large, powerful predators, may sometimes attack and kill humans; it is worth noting that they have all been filmed in open water by unprotected divers. A more known incident is the sinking of the USS Indianapolis (CA-35), where sharks believed to be oceanic whitetips fed on an estimated 150 of the survivors who were stranded for days.

Piranhas

Attacks by piranhas resulting in deaths have occurred in the Amazon basin. In 2011, a drunk 18-year-old man was attacked and killed in Rosario del Yata, Bolivia. In 2012, a five-year-old Brazilian girl was attacked and killed by a shoal of P. nattereri. Some Brazilian rivers have warning signs about lethal piranhas.

Catfish

Reports have been made of goonch catfish eating humans in the Kali River in India. Additionally there have been reports of Wels catfish killing and eating humans in Europe. Large predatory catfish such as the redtail catfish and piraíba are thought to have contributed to the loss of life when the Sobral Santos II ferry sank in the Amazon River in 1981.

Groupers 
The giant grouper is one of the largest species of bony fish in the world, reaching a maximum length of 3 meters and weight of 600 kilograms. There have been cases of this species attacking humans, along with the closely-related Atlantic goliath grouper.

Invertebrates

Cephalopods 

Some large cephalopods, in particular the Humboldt squid, are said to attack and eat humans.

Death tolls

Individual man-eater death tolls include:
  
 436 — Champawat tiger (Nepal/India)
 400 — Leopard of Panar (Northern India)
 300+ — Gustave (crocodile) (Burundi), rumoured
 150 — Leopard of the Central Provinces of India
 135 — Tsavo's man-eating lions (Kenya)
 125+ — Leopard of Rudraprayag (India)
 113+ (a 1987 study suggests that the beast had killed up to 500 victims) — Beast of Gévaudan (France)
 100 — Leopard of Golis Range (Somaliland), Leopard of Kahani (India) and Tigress of Bhimashankar (India)
 90+ — Chiengi lion (Zambia) 
 83 — Osama Crocodile (Uganda) 
 64 — Tigers of Chowgarh (India)
 60+ — Wolves of Uttar Pradesh (India) 
 50+ — Osama Lion (Tanzania) 
 43 — Namelieza Lion (Namibia) 
 42 — Leopard of Gummalapur (India)
 40 — Wolves of Paris (France) 
 36 — Mulanje Hyenas (Malawi)
 30+ — Leopard of Mulher Valley (India)
 24 — Tiger of the Dudhwa National Park (India)
 22 — Kirov wolf attacks (Russia) and Wolves of Turku (Finland)
 18 — Beast of Sarlat (likely a rabid wolf) (France)
 17 — Wolves of Ashta (India)
 15 — Tigress of Jowlagiri (India)
 13 — Wolves of Hazaribagh (India) and Tigress of Yavatmal (India)
 12 — Wolf of Gysinge (Sweden), Sloth bear of Mysore (India) and Leopard of Punanai (Sri Lanka)  
 11 — Port St-John Shark Attacks (South Africa Second Beach 2001–Present)
 10 — Gaver Tigers (India)
 9 — Wolf of Cusago (Italy)
 7 — Tiger of Mundachipallam (South India), Sankebetsu bear (Japan) and Tigress of Moradabad
 6 — Mfuwe man eating lion (Zambia) and Crocodile of Bang Mood (Thailand)
 5 — Tiger of Segur (India)
 4 — Wolf of Soissons (France), New Jersey Shark (North New Jersey) and Thak man-eater (India)
 3 — Leopard of the Yellagiri Hills (India)
 uncertain number (source states that the number of victim could be as high as 1,500, but the events are credited as somewhat fictionalized) — Lions of Njombe (Tanzania)
 uncertain number — Battle of Ramree Island crocodile attacks (Myanmar)
 uncertain number — Wolf of Ansbach (Germany of the Holy Roman Empire) 
 uncertain number (some sources state that the number of victims could be as high as 150) — USS Indianapolis shark attacks (Philippine Sea)
 uncertain number — IIT Gandhinagar stray dog attacks (India)

See also
 Animal attack
 Damnatio ad bestias, an ancient form of execution where condemned prisoners were killed by animals
 Human–wildlife conflict
 Malawi Terror Beast
 Man-eating plant, various legendary large carnivorous plants

References

Anthropophagy
Deaths due to animal attacks